The High Commission of Zambia in London is the diplomatic mission of Zambia in the United Kingdom.

A plaque outside the High Commission commemorates the painter John Everett Millais who lived and died in the building.

Gallery

References

External links
 Official site

See also 

 United Kingdom–Zambia relations

Zambia
Diplomatic missions of Zambia
United Kingdom–Zambia relations
Buildings and structures in the Royal Borough of Kensington and Chelsea
Zambia and the Commonwealth of Nations
South Kensington